Signal is an extinct town in northern Phelps County, in the U.S. state of Missouri.

A post office was established at Signal in 1903, and remained in operation until 1905. It is unknown why the name "Signal" was applied to this community.

References

Ghost towns in Missouri
Former populated places in Phelps County, Missouri